Camp Lakota may refer to:

Camp Lakota (California)
Camp Lakota (Illinois)
Camp Lakota (Iowa)
Camp Lakota (New York)
Camp Lakota (Ohio)
Camp Lakota (Wisconsin)